KRLN (1400 AM) is a radio station broadcasting in a News Talk Information format. Licensed to Canon City, Colorado, United States, it serves Fremont County, Colorado.  The station is currently owned by Royal Gorge Broadcasting, LLC.

External links
KRLN 1400 Newsradio Facebook
 
 
 

RLN